Dvora Omer (October 9, 1932 – May 2, 2013) was an Israeli author.

Biography 
Dvora OMER was born in 1932 in Kibbutz Ma'oz Haim in Mandatory Palestine. Her parents divorced when she was a child, and when she was 11 years old, her mother was killed in a training accident, in the Hagana, a pre-state military organization. Her father, Moshe Mosenzon, was a newspaper editor who served in the Jewish Brigade. In his absence, Dvora was raised by the kibbutz. 
She was married to Shmuel Omer, with whom she had three children. 

Omer began writing while she was a teacher, and continued with many books that reflect the developing state and culture of Israel. Most of her books are for young adults, and have been translated into many languages. She died on May 2, 2013, aged 80, at Kfar Ma'as.

Awards and recognition 
 In 1968, Omer was awarded the Lamdan Prize, for children's literature.
In 1979, she was awarded the Prime Minister's Prize for Hebrew Literary Works.
 In 2006, she was awarded the Israel Prize, for her lifetime achievement and special contribution to society and the State.

See also 
 List of Israel Prize recipients
 Hebrew literature
 Culture of Israel

References 

1932 births
2013 deaths
People from Maoz Haim
Israel Prize for lifetime achievement & special contribution to society recipients
Israel Prize women recipients
Israeli schoolteachers
Israeli women children's writers
Israeli women novelists
20th-century Israeli novelists
20th-century Israeli women writers
Recipients of Prime Minister's Prize for Hebrew Literary Works